Xylophanes meridanus is a moth of the  family Sphingidae. It is known from Suriname.

It is similar to Xylophanes amadis, but the pale median band is always interrupted by black streaks along the veins, particularly those of the posterior part of the wing.

The larvae possibly feed on Psychotria panamensis, Psychotria nervosa and Pavonia guanacastensis.

References

meridanus
Moths described in 1910
Endemic fauna of Suriname
Moths of South America